Stephen Crowley  may refer to:

Stephen Crowley (cricketer) (1961-), English cricketer
Loxie & Zoot, a webcomic by Australian artist Grace Crowley (formerly known as Stephen Crowley)
Steve Crowley, Marine
Steven Crowley, actor in Bachelor Party 2: The Last Temptation